Anthony Ruiz (born November 3, 1977) is an American professional mixed martial artist currently competing in the Light Heavyweight and Middleweight divisions of MMA. A professional since 2003, he has competed for Bellator MMA, Strikeforce, the WEC, ShoXC, King of the Cage, Tachi Palace Fights, and the Palace Fighting Championship.

Mixed martial arts career

Early career
Ruiz began his professional MMA career in February 2003, debuting on Gladiator Challenge show. Fighting for a variety of California-based MMA promotions, he amassed a record of 13 wins against 9 losses over the first three years of his career.

Strikeforce
In October 2006, Ruiz signed with the Strikeforce promotion.  He fought on both main cards and on their ShoXC shows, earning a record of 2 wins and 4 losses with the company.

International competition
In 2012, Ruiz fought for the first time outside of his native California.  Vladimir Putin wired $150,000 to Ruiz after his fight with Alexander Shlemenko at League S-70: Russian Championship Final because he was so impressed with his performance.

Bellator MMA
Ruiz was expected to make his Bellator debut on September 19, 2014 at Bellator 125 against Rafael Carvalho. However, when Brian Rogers' opponent, Brett Cooper, pulled out of their scheduled bout on the same card due to injury, Carvalho was moved up to the main card to face Rogers. Ruiz instead faced Nate James. He lost via split decision.

Ruiz was a participant in Bellator's one-night Light Heavyweight tournament at Bellator MMA & Glory: Dynamite 1 on September 19, 2015.  He faced Francis Carmont in the Alternate bout and lost by unanimous decision.

Mixed martial arts record

|-
|Loss
| align=center| 36–25
| Kendall Grove
| Submission (triangle choke)
| WFC 110
| 
| align=center| 1
| align=center| 4:30
| Wailuku, Hawaii, United States
|Catchweight (195 lbs) bout.
|- 
|Loss
| align=center| 36–24
| Kultar Gill
| Submission (triangle choke)
| Mamba Fight Night 6
| 
| align=center| 1
| align=center| 4:02
| Abbotsford, British Columbia, Canada
|Catchweight (192 lbs) bout.
|- 
|Loss
| align=center| 36–23
| Jordan Young
| Submission (rear-naked choke)
| Bellator 210
| 
| align=center| 1
| align=center| 3:48
| Thackerville, Oklahoma, United States
|
|-
| Win
| align=center| 36–22
| Joey Cabezas
| Submission (rear-naked choke)
| Tachi Palace Fights 32
| 
| align=center| 2
| align=center| 4:19
| Lemoore, California, United States
|Ruiz announced his retirement pre-fight.
|-
| Loss
| align=center| 35–22
| Joachim Christensen
| Submission (armbar)
| Abu Dhabi Warriors 4
| 
| align=center| 1
| align=center| 4:47
| Abu Dhabi, United Arab Emirates
| 
|-
| Loss
| align=center| 35–21
| Francis Carmont
| Decision (unanimous)
| Bellator 142: Dynamite 1
| 
| align=center| 2
| align=center| 5:00
| San Jose, California, United States
| 
|-
| Loss
| align=center| 35–20
| Nate James
| Decision (split)
| Bellator 125
| 
| align=center| 3
| align=center| 5:00
| Fresno, California, United States
| 
|-
| Loss
| align=center| 35–19
| Alexey Butorin
| TKO (punches)
| Plotforma S-70 5 
| 
| align=center| 3
| align=center| 4:46
| Sochi, Russia
| 
|-
| Win
| align=center| 35–18
| Ramazan Mukailov 
| Decision (unanimous)
| FEFoMP: Cup of Sakhalin Administration Head  
| 
| align=center| 3 
| align=center| 5:00 
| Yuzhno-Sakhalinsk, Russia
| 
|-
| Win
| align=center| 34–18
| Owen Rubio
| TKO (punches)
| TWC 19: Blackout 
| 
| align=center| 2 
| align=center| 2:33 
| Porterville, California, United States
| 
|-
| Win
| align=center| 33–18
| Collin Hart
| Decision (split)
| TPF 17: Fall Brawl 
| 
| align=center| 3 
| align=center| 5:00 
| Lemoore, California, United States
|Middleweight bout.
|-
| Win
| align=center| 32–18
| Rafael del Real
| Submission (rear-naked choke)
| Gladiator Challenge: Showdown 
| 
| align=center| 1 
| align=center| 1:35 
| Woodlake, California, United States
| 
|-
| Loss
| align=center| 31–18
| Angel Deanda
| TKO (punches)
| TPF 15: Collision Course
| 
| align=center| 3 
| align=center| 3:39 
| Lemoore, California, United States
|For Tachi Palace Fights Light Heavyweight Championship.
|-
| Loss
| align=center| 31–17
| Alexander Shlemenko
| Decision (unanimous)
| League S-70: Russian Championship Final
| 
| align=center| 3
| align=center| 5:00
| Sochi, Russia
| 
|-
| Win
| align=center| 30–16
| Scott Rosa
| TKO (punches)
| West Coast Fighting Championships: Showdown
| 
| align=center| 2
| align=center| 3:43
| Yuba City, California, United States
| 
|-
| Win
| align=center| 29–16
| Jared Torgeson
| Decision (unanimous)
| West Coast Fighting Championships: Bruvado Bash
| 
| align=center| 5
| align=center| 5:00
| Placerville, California, United States
| 
|-
| Win
| align=center| 28–16
| Rick Randolph
| TKO (punches)
| Fight for Wrestling 4
| 
| align=center| 2
| align=center| 4:00
| San Luis Obispo, California, United States
| 
|-
| Win
| align=center| 27–16
| Mike Moreno
| TKO (punches)
| Fight for Wrestling 4
| 
| align=center| N/A
| align=center| N/A
| Riverside, California, United States
| 
|-
| Win
| align=center| 26–16
| Reggie Orr
| Submission (arm triangle choke)
| MEZ Sports: Pandemonium 5
| 
| align=center| 2
| align=center| N/A
| Riverside, California, United States
| 
|-
| Loss
| align=center| 25–16
| Gerald Harris
| Decision (unanimous)
| TPF 9: The Contenders
| 
| align=center| 3
| align=center| 5:00
| Lemoore, California, United States
| 
|-
| Loss
| align=center| 25–15
| Givanildo Santana
| Submission (armbar)
| MEZ Sports: Pandemonium 3
| 
| align=center| 2
| align=center| 4:37
| Los Angeles, California, United States
| 
|-
| Loss
| align=center| 25–14
| Leopoldo Serao
| Decision (split)
| TPF 6: High Stakes
| 
| align=center| 5
| align=center| 5:00
| Lemoore, California, United States
| 
|-
| Win
| align=center| 25–13
| Kenny McCorkell
| TKO (punches)
| Pure Combat: Drop Zone
| 
| align=center| 4
| align=center| 3:50
| Camp Pendleton, California, United States
| 
|-
| Win
| align=center| 24–13
| Hector Ramirez
| Decision (split)
| TPF 3: Champions Collide
| 
| align=center| 3
| align=center| 5:00
| Lemoore, California, United States
|Light Heavyweight bout.
|-
| Win
| align=center| 23–13
| Xavier Foupa-Pokam
| Decision (unanimous)
| TPF 2: Brawl in the Hall
| 
| align=center| 3
| align=center| 5:00
| Lemoore, California, United States
| 
|-
| Win
| align=center| 22–13
| Gan McGee
| KO (punches)
| Pure Combat 9: Home Turf
| 
| align=center| 3
| align=center| 1:14
| Visalia, California, United States
| 
|-
| Loss
| align=center| 21–13
| Aaron Rosa
| Technical Submission (rear-naked choke)
| Strikeforce Challengers: Evangelista vs. Aina
| 
| align=center| 1
| align=center| 4:29
| Fresno, California, United States
| 
|-
| Loss
| align=center| 21–12
| Trevor Prangley
| Decision (unanimous)
| Strikeforce: At The Mansion II
| 
| align=center| 3
| align=center| 5:00
| Los Angeles, California, United States
| 
|-
| Win
| align=center| 21–11
| Jeremy Freitag
| Decision (unanimous)
| EliteXC: Unfinished Business
| 
| align=center| 3
| align=center| 5:00
| Stockton, California, United States
| 
|-
| Loss
| align=center| 20–11
| Bobby Southworth
| Decision (unanimous)
| Strikeforce: Melendez vs. Thomson
| 
| align=center| 5
| align=center| 5:00
| San Jose, California, United States
| 
|-
| Win
| align=center| 20–10
| Brad Imes
| Decision (split)
| PFC 6: No Retreat, No Surrender
| 
| align=center| 3
| align=center| 3:00
| Lemoore, California, United States
| 
|-
| Win
| align=center| 19–10
| Jimmy Ambriz
| Submission (verbal)
| PURECOMBAT: From the Ashes
| 
| align=center| 1
| align=center| N/A
| Visalia, California, United States
|Heavyweight bout.
|-
| Win
| align=center| 18–10
| Bobby Southworth
| TKO (doctor stoppage)
| Strikeforce: Four Men Enter, One Man Survives
| 
| align=center| 2
| align=center| 0:52
| San Jose, California, United States
| 
|-
| Win
| align=center| 17–10
| Francisco Bueno
| Decision
| GC 69: Bad Intentions
| 
| align=center| 3
| align=center| N/A
| Sacramento, California, United States
| 
|-
| Win
| align=center| 16–10
| Jason Geris
| TKO (referee stoppage)
| ShoXC: Elite Challenger Series
| 
| align=center| 1
| align=center| 5:00
| Santa Ynez, California, United States
| 
|-
| Win
| align=center| 15–10
| Jeremy Freitag
| TKO
| GC 57: Holiday Beatings
| 
| align=center| 3
| align=center| 3:48
| Sacramento, California, United States
| 
|-
| Loss
| align=center| 14–10
| Trevor Prangley
| Submission (armbar)
| Strikeforce: Tank vs. Buentello
| 
| align=center| 1
| align=center| 1:42
| Fresno, California, United States
| 
|-
| Win
| align=center| 14–9
| Jeremy Freitag
| TKO (punches)
| WEC 23: Hot August Fights
| 
| align=center| 2
| align=center| 2:46
| Lemoore, California, United States
| 
|-
| Win
| align=center| 13–9
| Dan Molina
| Decision (unanimous)
| GC 51: Madness at the Memorial
| 
| align=center| 3
| align=center| 5:00
| Sacramento, California, United States
| 
|-
| Loss
| align=center| 12–9
| Vladimir Matyushenko
| Submission (armbar)
| Extreme Wars 3: Bay Area Brawl
| 
| align=center| 1
| align=center| 2:03
| Oakland, California, United States
| 
|-
| Win
| align=center| 12–8
| Shannon Kilgore
| KO
| KOTC: Heavy Hitters
| 
| align=center| 1
| align=center| 1:05
| California, United States
| 
|-
| Win
| align=center| 11–8
| Shane Yocum
| TKO
| GC 46: Avalanche
| 
| align=center| 1
| align=center| 4:54
| Coarsegold, California, United States
| 
|-
| Win
| align=center| 10–8
| Josh Jackson
| TKO
| GC 43: Gladiator Challenge 43
| 
| align=center| 1
| align=center| 2:12
| Porterville, California, United States
| 
|-
| Loss
| align=center| 9–8
| Jocquin Sanchez
| Submission (guillotine choke)
| GC 39: Titans Collide
| 
| align=center| 1
| align=center| 0:21
| Porterville, California, United States
| 
|-
| Loss
| align=center| 9–7
| Eddie Sanchez
| Technical Submission (choke)
| KOTC 54: Mucho Machismo
| 
| align=center| 1
| align=center| 2:49
| San Jacinto, California, United States
| 
|-
| Loss
| align=center| 9–6
| Bryan Travers
| Submission (guillotine choke)
| GC 37: Throwdown
| 
| align=center| 1
| align=center| 3:16
| Porterville, California, United States
| 
|-
| Win
| align=center| 9–5
| Jeff Lacefield
| Submission
| GC 35: Cold Fury
| 
| align=center| 1
| align=center| 2:15
| Porterville, California, United States
| 
|-
| Loss
| align=center| 8–5
| Jaime Jara
| TKO
| GC 33: Brutal Force
| 
| align=center| 1
| align=center| 3:36
| Porterville, California, United States
| 
|-
| Win
| align=center| 8–4
| Brian Sesma
| TKO (retirement)
| KOTC 44: Revenge
| 
| align=center| 1
| align=center| 5:00
| San Jacinto, California, United States
| 
|-
| Win
| align=center| 7–4
| Paul Mince
| Decision (unanimous)
| GC 31: Knockout Nightmare
| 
| align=center| 2
| align=center| 5:00
| Porterville, California, United States
| 
|-
| Loss
| align=center| 6–4
| Jaime Jara
| Submission (armbar)
| GC 27: FightFest 2
| 
| align=center| 2
| align=center| 2:05
| Colusa, California, United States
| 
|-
| Win
| align=center| 6–3
| Bryan Pardoe
| TKO
| GC 26: FightFest 1
| 
| align=center| 1
| align=center| 2:25
| Colusa, California, United States
| 
|-
| Loss
| align=center| 5–3
| Jaime Jara
| Submission (armbar)
| GC 26: FightFest 1
| 
| align=center| 1
| align=center| 1:36
| Colusa, California, United States
| 
|-
| Loss
| align=center| 5–2
| Dusty Arden
| Decision (unanimous)
| GC 23: Gladiator Challenge 23
| 
| align=center| 2
| align=center| 5:00
| Porterville, California, United States
| 
|-
| Win
| align=center| 5–1
| Eduardo Martines
| Decision
| GC 21: Gladiator Challenge 21
| 
| align=center| 2
| align=center| 5:00
| Porterville, California, United States
| 
|-
| Win
| align=center| 4–1
| Josh Rudiger
| KO
| GC 20: Gladiator Challenge 20
| 
| align=center| 1
| align=center| 0:46
| Colusa, California, United States
| 
|-
| Win
| align=center| 3–1
| Robert Escalara
| KO
| GC 19: Gladiator Challenge 19
| 
| align=center| 1
| align=center| 3:03
| Porterville, California, United States
| 
|-
| Win
| align=center| 2–1
| John Dacota
| TKO
| GC 17: Gladiator Challenge 17
| 
| align=center| 1
| align=center| 0:17
| Porterville, California, United States
| 
|-
| Win
| align=center| 1–1
| Richard Toland
| Submission (choke)
| GC 15: Gladiator Challenge 15
| 
| align=center| 1
| align=center| 2:31
| Porterville, California, United States
| 
|-
| Loss
| align=center| 0–1
| Desi Miner
| Submission (rear-naked choke)
| GC 14: Gladiator Challenge 14
| 
| align=center| 2
| align=center| 2:29
| Porterville, California, United States
|

References

External links

American male mixed martial artists
Mixed martial artists utilizing Brazilian jiu-jitsu
American mixed martial artists of Mexican descent
American practitioners of Brazilian jiu-jitsu
Sportspeople from Fresno, California
1977 births
Living people
People from Coarsegold, California